John David Landis is the Crossways Professor of City and Regional Planning and Department Chair of the Department of City and Regional Planning at the University of Pennsylvania. Landis attended MIT and UC Berkeley.

References 

Year of birth missing (living people)
Living people
University of Pennsylvania faculty
MIT School of Architecture and Planning alumni
UC Berkeley College of Environmental Design alumni